Alicia Urreta (12 October 193020 December 1986) was a Mexican pianist, music educator and composer.

Biography
Alicia Urreta was born in Veracruz, Veracruz. In 1952 she entered the Conservatorio Nacional de Música in Mexico City, studying harmony with Rodolfo Halffter, and other topics under Hernández Moncada, León Mariscal, and Sandor Roth. In 1969, she studied with Jean-Etienne Marie at Schola Cantorum of Paris, France. She also studied piano instruction from Alfred Brendel and Alicia de Larrocha. She later worked as a concert pianist for the Orquesta Sinfónica Nacional. She also taught at the University of Mexico and was an instructor in acoustics at the Instituto Politécnico Nacional of Mexico City.

Urreta established the National Symphony Orchestra (1975), was the general Coordinator of the National Opera Company of INBA. music coordinator of the Casa del Lago, musical performances director of the National Autonomous University of Mexico and founder of the Camerata of Mexico. In 1984, she had begun organizing musical festivals to promote Mexican and Spanish contemporary music, collaborating with Spanish composer Cruz de Castro. She premiered her Concerto for Piano and Orchestra with Orquesta Sinfónica Nacional in 1982. She died in Mexico City in 1987.

Works
Urreta composed, among other works, a chamber opera, five ballets, pieces for solo instruments, a cantata, incidental music, a musique concrète composition for Noh theater and film scores.

Stage
Cubos ballet
Luiz negra ballet
Mujer flor ballet
Un día de Luis ballet with electronics
Tantra ballet with musique concrète
Cante, homenaje a Manuel de Falla for actors, singers, three dancers, slides, percussion and tape, 1976
Romance do Doña Balada opera, 1973

Orchestral
Ralenti for tape, 1969
Arcana, concerto for amplified piano and orchestra

Chamber
Homage for string quartet
Estudio sobre una guitarra for tape
Salmodia II for piano and tape, 1980
De Natura mortis o la Verdadera historia de Caperucita Roja for narrator, instruments, and tape, 1971
Selva de Pájaros for tape, 1978
Dameros II for tape, 1984
Dameros III for tape, 1985

References

1930 births
1986 deaths
Mexican women classical composers
Mexican classical composers
Mexican classical pianists
Mexican women pianists
Mexican music educators
Writers from Veracruz
Musicians from Veracruz
People from Veracruz (city)
Academic staff of the National Autonomous University of Mexico
20th-century classical composers
20th-century classical pianists
Women music educators
Women classical pianists
20th-century women composers
20th-century women pianists